The Gulf of Suez (formerly , ,  "Sea of Calm") is a gulf at the northern end of the Red Sea, to the west of the Sinai Peninsula. Situated to the east of the Sinai Peninsula is the smaller Gulf of Aqaba. The gulf was formed within a relatively young but now inactive Gulf of Suez Rift rift basin, dating back about 26 million years. Along the mid-line of the gulf is the boundary between Africa and Asia. The entrance of the gulf lies atop the mature Gemsa oil and gas field.
The gulf is considered one of the world's important maritime zones due to being an entrance to the Suez Canal.

Geography
The gulf occupies the northwestern arm of the Red Sea between Africa and the Sinai Peninsula. It is the third arm of the triple junction rift system, the second arm being the Gulf of Aqaba.

Extent
The International Hydrographic Organization defines the southern limit of the gulf as "A line running from Ras Muhammed (27°43'N) to the South point of Shadwan Island (34°02'E) and thence Westward on a parallel (27°27'N) to the coast of Africa".

Geology

The Gems Field was discovered in 1869, but did not produce until 1910. The Hurghada Field produced in 1913. By 1998, over 1900 wells had been drilled and 120 fields identified.

The gulf sedimentary basin stratigraphic section consists of prerift Paleozoic to Oligocene clastic rocks and carbonates, and synrift and postrift Miocene to Holocene clastics and evaporites.
Three large oil fields are in the gulf: the El Morgan discovered in 1964, Belayim discovered in 1955, and the October Field discovered in 1977. The October Field produces from the Cretaceous Nubia Formation, the Upper Cretaceous Nezzazat Formation, the Miocene Nukhul Formation, and the Miocene Asl Member of the Upper Rudeis Formation.

Ecology

References

External links

 Satellite photographs of the Gulf, and of the Suez Canal

Bodies of water of the Red Sea
Suez
Bodies of water of Egypt
Suez Canal
Red Sea Governorate
South Sinai Governorate
Suez Governorate